Coptotriche badiiella is a species of moth in the  family Tischeriidae. It is found in eastern North America, from Ontario and  Michigan south to Louisiana and North Carolina.

The larvae feed on Quercus species, including Quercus alba and Quercus palustris. They mine the leaves of their host plant. The mine has the form of an ovate blotch mine.

References

Moths described in 1875
Tischeriidae